Andrea Montermini (born 30 May 1964) is an Italian racing driver.

Career
Montermini raced in Formula 3 in 1989, taking second place in the Monaco GP support race and 4th in the Italian F3 Championship. He then moved up to Formula 3000, racing for three seasons before finally taking second place in the 1992 season, winning three rounds while driving for the Il Barone Rampante team.

He participated in 29 Formula One Grands Prix, debuting on 29 May 1994 for Simtek, replacing  Roland Ratzenberger, who had been killed during qualifying for the 1994 San Marino Grand Prix. Montermini himself crashed heavily in practice for the 1994 Spanish Grand Prix, breaking his left heel and his right foot. He returned to Formula One the next season, with the Pacific Grand Prix team, and drove for Forti in 1996 alongside countryman Luca Badoer until the team folded. For the 1997 season Montermini was signed as test driver for the MasterCard Lola team, but it folded after one race. He scored no points in his Formula One career.

He competed in the American Champ Car series three different seasons: 1993-1994 and 1999. He scored a 4th place at Detroit in his first season, driving for the underfunded Euromotorsport team.  In 1999 he drove a few events for Dan Gurney in Gurney's last season of team ownership.  When others such as Alex Barron, Gualter Salles and Raul Boesel were replaced, he filled in and scored a best finish of 11th in Vancouver.

He raced in the 2001 24 Hours of Daytona, but has primarily raced in the FIA GT Championship, mostly in Ferrari cars. He has taken two class wins and four further class podiums. In 2006 he has occasionally raced alongside Jarek Janis and Sascha Bert in a Saleen ran by the Zakspeed team. In 2007 he won the International GT Open's GTA class, driving a Ferrari 430 for Scuderia Playteam alongside co-champion Michele Maceratesi, the duo becoming overall champions the following season. He won a second overall championship title in 2013.

Racing record

Complete International Formula 3000 results
(key) (Races in bold indicate pole position; races in italics indicate fastest lap.)

American open wheel racing results
(key)

CART

Complete Formula One results
(key)

24 Hours of Le Mans results

References

External links

Profile on F1 Rejects
Official website

1964 births
Living people
People from Sassuolo
Italian racing drivers
Italian Formula One drivers
Simtek Formula One drivers
Pacific Formula One drivers
Forti Formula One drivers
FIA GT Championship drivers
International Formula 3000 drivers
Champ Car drivers
24 Hours of Le Mans drivers
European Le Mans Series drivers
Porsche Supercup drivers
International GT Open drivers
24 Hours of Spa drivers
Blancpain Endurance Series drivers
24H Series drivers
Sportspeople from the Province of Modena
Nismo drivers
Dale Coyne Racing drivers
EuroInternational drivers
Walter Lechner Racing drivers
Ombra Racing drivers
AF Corse drivers
Le Mans Cup drivers